Bastian Kaltenböck (born 23 July 1983 in Hallein, Austria) is a ski jumper from Austria. Kaltenböck competed in the Ski jumping World Cup between 2003 and 2009. He also has nine individual Continental Cup-wins.

In the 2010 Winter Olympics Kaltenböck ended his career as a trialjumper.

The new bindings system, first used by Simon Ammann was Kaltenböck's idea.

References 

Bastian Kaltenboeck FIS-Bio

Austrian male ski jumpers
Universiade medalists in ski jumping
Living people
1983 births
People from Hallein
Universiade bronze medalists for Austria
Competitors at the 2009 Winter Universiade
Sportspeople from Salzburg (state)